Noah Baumbach (born September 3, 1969) is an American film director and screenwriter. He is known for making witty and intellectual comedies set in New York City and has often been compared to writer-directors such as Woody Allen and Whit Stillman. His frequent collaborators include Greta Gerwig, Adam Driver, and Wes Anderson.

Baumbach gained attention for his early films Kicking and Screaming (1995), and Mr. Jealousy (1997). His breakthrough film The Squid and the Whale (2005) earned him a nomination for the Academy Award for Best Original Screenplay. He started his long time collaborations with his partner Greta Gerwig with Greenberg (2010), and continued with Frances Ha (2013), Mistress America (2015), and White Noise (2022). 

His other films include Margot at the Wedding (2007), While We're Young (2014), and The Meyerowitz Stories (2017). His film Marriage Story (2019) earned an Academy Award for Best Picture nomination and Baumbach's second Best Original Screenplay nomination. He is also known for co-writing, with Wes Anderson, The Life Aquatic with Steve Zissou (2004) and Fantastic Mr. Fox (2009).

Early life and education
Baumbach was born on September 3, 1969 in Brooklyn, New York. His father, Jonathan Baumbach, was an author of experimental fiction and the co-founder of the publishing house Fiction Collective, taught at Stanford University and Brooklyn College, and was a film critic for Partisan Review. His mother, Georgia Brown, was a film critic for The Village Voice who also wrote fiction. His father was Jewish; his mother is Protestant. His parents divorced during his adolescence, which served as inspiration for his 2005 film The Squid and the Whale. Baumbach has three siblings, two of whom are from a previous marriage of his father's.

Baumbach grew up in Park Slope, Brooklyn, and was determined to become a filmmaker from a young age. Films that influenced Baumbach include The Jerk, Animal House, Heaven Can Wait, The World According To Garp, E.T. the Extra-Terrestrial, and Invasion Of The Body Snatchers.

He graduated from Brooklyn's Midwood High School in 1987 and received his BA in English from Vassar College in 1991. While at Vassar, he and fellow future filmmaker, Jason Blum, were roommates (Blum would later produce Baumbach's first film, Kicking and Screaming in 1995). Soon after, he briefly worked as a messenger at The New Yorker.

Career

1990s
Baumbach made his writing and directing debut in 1995 with Kicking and Screaming, a comedy about four young men who graduate from college and refuse to move on with their lives. The film starred Josh Hamilton, Chris Eigeman, and Carlos Jacott and premiered in 1995 at the New York Film Festival. In an interview with The A.V. Club, Baumbach said of his influences on the film, "I really responded to the kind of ensemble feeling of Metropolitan, I was also thinking a lot about Diner, which was another great ensemble "friends" comedy." Baumbach was chosen as one of Newsweeks "Ten New Faces of 1996". Roger Ebert praised the film's "good eye and a terrific ear; the dialogue by writer-director Noah Baumbach is not simply accurate... but a distillation of reality – elevating aimless brainy small-talk into a statement." Reviews often mentioned the thin and meandering plot, but most noted this as a facet of the characters' life stage. Janet Maslin of The New York Times stated, "Kicking and Screaming occupies its postage-stamp size terrain with confident comic style."

In 1997, he wrote and directed Mr. Jealousy, a film about a young writer so jealous about his girlfriend that he sneaks into the group therapy sessions of her ex-boyfriend to discover what kind of relationship they had. He then co-wrote (under the name Jesse Carter) and directed (under the name Ernie Fusco) the New York-set comedy of manners Highball. Baumbach disowned the film according to a 2005 interview in The A.V. Club, the director stated,

2000s

In 2004, Baumbach ventured his film collaboration with writer and director Wes Anderson by co-writing The Life Aquatic with Steve Zissou (2004) alongside Anderson. The following year, he released his fourth feature film, The Squid and the Whale (2005) which was a semi-autobiographical comedy-drama about his childhood in Brooklyn and the effect of his parents' divorce on the family in the mid-1980s. The film stars Jeff Daniels and Laura Linney in the parent roles. In an interview with author Jonathan Lethem in BOMB Magazine, Baumbach said of the film, "Sometimes when I think about the whole experience of this, it starts to become a joke within a joke within a joke. The film is not only inspired by my childhood and my parents’ divorce, but it was also the first script I didn't show to my parents while I was working on it. It's not that I wanted to protect them from anything. I just wanted to keep it my own experience." The Squid and the Whale was a sleeper hit and a critical success, earning Baumbach two awards at the 2005 Sundance Film Festival as well as an Academy Award nomination for Best Original Screenplay. It also received six Independent Spirit Award nominations, three Golden Globe nominations and the New York Film Critics Circle, Los Angeles Film Critics Association and the National Board of Review all voted it the year's best screenplay.

Baumbach wrote and directed the 2007 comedy-drama Margot at the Wedding, starring his then-wife Jennifer Jason Leigh, Nicole Kidman, Jack Black and John Turturro. In the film, Kidman plays a woman named Margot who spends several days visiting her sister Pauline (Leigh) on the eve of Pauline's wedding to Black's character. It was shot in April and May 2006 in Hampton Bays and City Island, Bronx. The film was released in the United States by Paramount Vantage on November 16, 2007.

Baumbach helped to write and direct the short films  Clearing the Air and New York Underground which aired on Saturday Night Live. The films were co-written and co-produced by cast-members Fred Armisen and Bill Hader. New York Underground featured Hader as a British rock journalist doing a piece on quirky underground musician Joshua Rainhorne (Armisen has performed as Joshua at numerous live events). Clearing the Air featured Hader, Armisen, and Paul Rudd (who was the guest host for that week) trying to clear the air over a girl they all slept with. Both pieces aired on SNL in the fall of 2008.

Baumbach co-wrote the screenplay for the 2009 film version of Roald Dahl's Fantastic Mr Fox with Wes Anderson, who directed it using stop-motion technology. The film was a critical success appearing on many critics top 10 lists of the year. The film also received the Academy Award, British Academy Film Award, and Golden Globe Award nomination for Best Animated Film, losing year to Pixar's Up. Despite the critical praise the film was not a financial success.

2010s 

His film Greenberg was released March 2010, and was nominated for the Golden Bear at the 60th Berlin International Film Festival.

In 2012, Baumbach directed the comedic drama Frances Ha, which he co-wrote with Greta Gerwig, who also starred. The film played at the Toronto International Film Festival. Baumbach filmed Frances Ha with his cinematographer Sam Levy digitally and in black-and-white, the latter to emulate in part collaborations by Woody Allen and his cinematographer Gordon Willis, in films like Manhattan (1979). CBS News compared Frances Has style to the works of Woody Allen, Jim Jarmusch and François Truffaut. Gerwig received a Golden Globe Award nomination for her performance.

Baumbach has "shown an affinity for writing about the East Coast elite." Baumbach has written an adaptation of Curtis Sittenfeld's novel Prep. He also co-wrote a screenplay for the animated film Madagascar 3: Europe's Most Wanted.  He worked on HBO's adaptation of the Jonathan Franzen novel The Corrections, but the pilot was never completed and HBO passed on the project.

Baumbach wrote and directed the 2014 comedy-drama While We're Young, starring Ben Stiller, Naomi Watts, Adam Driver and Amanda Seyfried.  A24 Films released the film on March 27, 2015, and the film went on to gross more than all of Baumbach's previous films in the United States box office.

He also directed and co-wrote the 2015 comedy Mistress America, starring Greta Gerwig and Lola Kirke. The film, which premiered at the Sundance Film Festival, was released to general audiences on August 14. That same year he presented De Palma, a documentary about filmmaker Brian De Palma that he co-directed with Jake Paltrow. It premiered at the 2015 Venice Film Festival.

In 2017, The Meyerowitz Stories was released on October 13 on Netflix. Before its streaming debut, the film was selected to compete for the Palme d'Or in the main competition at the 2017 Cannes Film Festival. The film focuses on a fractured and dysfunctional family, and starred Dustin Hoffman, Ben Stiller, Adam Sandler and Emma Thompson. On the review aggregator Rotten Tomatoes, the film holds an approval rating of 92% based on 181 reviews, and an average rating of 7.66/10. The website's critical consensus reads, "The Meyerowitz Stories (New and Selected) observes the family dynamic through writer-director Noah Baumbach's bittersweet lens and the impressive efforts of a remarkable cast." On Metacritic, which assigns a normalized rating, the film has a weighted average score of 79 out of 100, based on 40 critics, indicating "generally favorable reviews".

In 2019, Baumbach wrote, produced and directed Marriage Story. The film follows a showbusiness couple and their marriage breaking up followed by an emotional divorce preceding. The film starred Adam Driver and Scarlett Johansson as the family couple. Alan Alda, Ray Liotta and Laura Dern also portray the lawyers involved about the divorce. The film also featured performances by Merritt Wever, Julie Hagerty and Wallace Shawn. It premiered to great acclaim at the Venice Film Festival, before it was released on Netflix on November 6, 2019, with many ranking it among Baumbach's best work. Mark Kermode film critic from The Guardian wrote, "this often hilarious heartbreaker is simply Baumbach’s best film to date – insightful, sympathetic and rather beautifully bewildered", Kermode also compared the film to that of Annie Hall (1977), Kramer vs. Kramer (1979) and La Grande Illusion (1937). The film went on to receive six Academy Award nominations, including for Best Picture, and Best Original Screenplay. Driver and Johansson also received nominations in leading roles. Laura Dern won the Oscar for a supporting role. With the release of Marriage Story, it also made Baumbach one of the few screenwriters to ever sweep "The Big Four" critics awards: Los Angeles Film Critics Association, National Board of Review, New York Film Critics Circle, and National Society of Film Critics.

2020s 
Baumbach's feature film, White Noise is adapted from the 1985 novel of the same name by Don DeLillo. The film reunites him with Greta Gerwig and Adam Driver, and was backed by Netflix. The project began filming in late 2021, and was released on December 30th, 2022.

Influences 
Baumbach has noted that Woody Allen has been "an obvious influence", stating, "He was the single biggest pop culture influence on me". He has cited the films Manhattan, Zelig, and Broadway Danny Rose as influences on his work. He has also cited Ernst Lubitsch, Max Ophüls, Jean Renoir, Robert Altman, Peter Bogdanovich, Spike Lee, Whit Stillman, Steven Spielberg, as well as the screwball comedies of the 30s and 40s, and the films of the French New Wave as influences. His favorite film of all time is E.T. the Extra-Terrestrial.

Personal life 
Baumbach met actress Jennifer Jason Leigh in 2001, while she was starring on Broadway in Proof. The couple married on September 2, 2005. They have a son, Rohmer. Leigh filed for divorce from Baumbach on November 15, 2010, in Los Angeles, citing irreconcilable differences. The divorce was finalized in September 2013.

Baumbach's romantic and creative collaboration with actress, writer, and director Greta Gerwig began late in 2011, after they had met during the production of Greenberg (released in early 2010). In March 2019, it was announced Gerwig and Baumbach had a son named Harold.

Filmography

Film

Executive producer
 She's Funny that Way (2014)

Acting roles

Television

Awards and nominations 

Baumbach has been nominated for three Academy Awards for his The Squid and the Whale (2005), and Marriage Story (2019).

He has also received nominations from the Golden Globe Awards, British Academy Film Awards, Critics Choice Movie Awards, Cannes Film Festival, Venice Film Festival and Writers Guild of America Awards. He has been nominated for five Independent Spirit Film Awards and received two wins.

Bibliography

References

External links 

 
 Noah Baumbach at Rotten Tomatoes

1969 births
Living people
20th-century American male writers
21st-century American male writers
Jewish_American_film_directors
American male screenwriters
American people of Jewish descent
Animation screenwriters
Annie Award winners
Film directors from New York City
Midwood High School alumni
The New Yorker people
Screenwriters from New York (state)
Sundance Film Festival award winners
Vassar College alumni
Writers from Brooklyn
Yaddo alumni
Postmodernist filmmakers